The Thailand national under-21 football team, also known as the Thailand Pre-Olympic football team is the national team for under 21 level represents Thailand in international under-21 football competitions.  The squad is the feeder team for senior national football team and under 23 national football team. The team is managed by the Football Association of Thailand.

Schedule and results

Head coaches
{| class="wikitable mw-collapsible "
|-
!colspan=5 style="background: #013A5E; color: #FFFFFF;|Thailand national under-21 football team head coaches
|-
!Name
!Country
!Period
!Honour
|-
| Worrawoot Srimaka
| 
| 2016
| {{nowrap|2016 Nations Cup – Winners}}
|-bgcolor="#EFEFEF"
| Julian Marin Bazalo
| 
| 
|
|-
| Worrawoot Srimaka
| 
| 2018
| 
|-
| Alexandre Gama
| 
| 2018
| 
|-bgcolor="#EFEFEF"
|}

Competitive record
Exhibition game

Note* : Denotes draws including knockout matches decided on penalty kicks.''

Honours
This is a list of honours for the Thailand national under-21 football team.

Minor titles
 Nations Cup Winners (1): 2016

 Thanh Niên Cup'''
 Runner-up (1): 2016 International U-21 Thanh Niên Newspaper Cup

See also
 Thailand national football team
 Thailand national under-23 football team
 Thailand national under-20 football team
 Thailand national under-17 football team
 Football in Thailand

External links
 Football Association of Thailand 

Asian national under-21 association football teams
U21